Jeune fille en buste (Portrait of the young girl) is a work by Pierre-Narcisse Guérin painted in 1794 and exhibited at the Louvre in Paris.

Background
One of Guérin's early works, the painting treats the subject in a frank and direct way. It is a portrait of a young girl, depicted while covering her breasts with both hands. The smooth background, simplicity of the design and the use of the measured color are characteristic of the neo-classical style and of the school of Jean-Baptiste Regnault and Jacques-Louis David. The work was acquired by the Louvre in 1978.

The girl's short hair is inspired by the "Titus style model", popular in France at the time and based on the hairstyle of the Roman era. In fact, the work is one of the first paintings to depict this hairstyle. The style may have taken its name from Titus Junius Brutus, son of the Roman politician Lucius Junius Brutus.

Mary Novik's debut novel, Conceit used the image for the cover of the book.

References

External links

1794 paintings
Paintings in the Louvre by French artists
Women in art
Neoclassical paintings